Whites and sulphurs are small to medium-sized butterflies.  Their wingspans range from 0.8-4.0 inches (2-10.2 cm).  There are about 1,000 species worldwide with about 61 species in North America.  Most whites and sulphurs are white, yellow, and orange with some black, and some may be various shades of gray green.  Their flight is mostly slow and fluttering, but some of the larger species have quicker flights.  Both males and females like to feed at flowers, while males also like to puddle on damp ground.  Male whites and sulphurs locate females by patrolling.  The eggs are spindle shaped and laid singly.  Most of the long-slender larvae are green or yellow.  The chrysalis is usually triangular or cone headed.  It hangs upright supported by a silken loop around the middle.  The overwintering varies with species.  It may be larva, chrysalis, or adult.

Subfamily Pierinae: whites

 Pallid tilewhite, Hesperocharis costaricensis
 Mexican dartwhite, Catasticta nimbice
 Pine white, Neophasia menapia
 Chiricahua white, Neophasia terlootii
 Common green-eyed white, Leptophobia aripa
 Florida white, Appias drusilla
 Becker's white, Pontia beckerii
 Spring white, Pontia sisymbrii
 Checkered white, Pontia protodice
 Western white, Pontia occidentalis
 Mustard white, Pieris oleracea
 Margined white, Pieris marginalis
 Arctic white, Pieris angelika
 West Virginia white, Pieris virginiensis
 Cabbage white, Pieris rapae
 Great southern white, Ascia monuste
 Giant white, Ganyra josephina
 Howarth's white, Ganyra howarthi
 Painted white, Pieriballia viardi
 Common melwhite, Melete lycimnia
 Crossbarred white, Itaballia demophile
 Large marble, Euchloe ausonides
 Green marble, Euchloe naina
 Northern marble, Euchloe creusa
 Sonoran marble, Euchloe guaymasensis
 Pearly marble, Euchloe hyantis
 California pearly marble, Euchloe hyantis hyantis
 Desert pearly marble, Euchloe hyantis lotta
 Olympia marble, Euchloe olympia
 Desert orangetip, Anthocharis cethura
 Pima orangetip, Anthocharis cethura pima
 Sara orangetip, Anthocharis sara
 Pacific Sara orangetip, Anthocharis sara sara
 Stella Sara orangetip, Anthocharis sara stella
 Falcate orangetip, Anthocharis midea
 Gray marble, Anthocharis lanceolata

Subfamily Coliadinae: sulphurs

 Statira sulphur, Aphrissa statira
 Clouded sulphur, Colias philodice
 Orange sulphur, Colias eurytheme
 Western sulphur, Colias occidentalis
 Colias occidentalis chrysomelas
 Colias occidentalis pseudochristina
 Christina's sulphur, Colias christina
 Queen Alexandra's sulphur, Colias alexandra
 Harford's Queen Alexandra's sulphur, Colias alexandra harfordii
 Colias alexandra krauthii
 Mead's sulphur, Colias meadii
 Coppermine sulphur, Colias johanseni
 Canadian sulphur, Colias canadensis
 Hecla sulphur, Colias hecla
 Booth's sulphur, Colias tyche
 Labrador sulphur, Colias nastes
 Colias nastes thula
 Scudder's sulphur, Colias scudderi
 Giant sulphur, Colias gigantea
 Sierra sulphur, Colias behrii
 Pelidne sulphur, Colias pelidne
 Pink-edged sulphur, Colias interior
 Palaeno sulphur, Colias palaeno
 California dogface, Zerene eurydice
 Southern dogface, Zerene cesonia
 White angled-sulphur, Anteos clorinde
 Yellow angled-sulphur, Anteos maerula
 Cloudless sulphur, Phoebis sennae
 Orange-barred sulphur, Phoebis philea
 Large orange sulphur, Phoebis agarithe
 Tailed sulphur, Phoebis neocypris
 Orbed sulphur, Phoebis orbis
 Lyside sulphur, Kricogonia lyside
 Barred yellow, Eurema daira
 Ghost yellow, Eurema albula
 Boisduval's yellow, Eurema boisduvaliana
 Mexican yellow, Eurema mexicana
 Salome yellow, Eurema salome
 Tailed orange, Eurema proterpia
 Little yellow, Eurema lisa
 Mimosa yellow, Eurema nise
 Shy yellow, Eurema messalina
 Dina yellow, Eurema dina
 Sleepy orange, Eurema nicippe
 Dainty sulphur, Nathalis iole

Subfamily Dismorphiinae: mimic-whites

 Costa-spotted mimic-white, Enantia albania

References
Jim P. Brock, Kenn Kaufman (2003). Butterflies of North America. Boston: Houghton Mifflin. .

North America
Pieridae